The most common rodents kept as household pets are hamsters (golden hamsters and dwarf hamsters), gerbils (Mongolian jirds and duprasi gerbils), common degus, fancy mice, fancy rats, common chinchillas, and guinea pigs (cavies).

The domestication of small mammals is a relatively recent development, arising only after large-scale industrialization. Historically, Western society was more agrarian than today, with rodents as a whole seen as vermin that were carriers for disease and a threat to crops. Animals that hunted such pests (e.g. terriers and cats) were prized.

Some of these small rodents are prohibited from being kept as pets in certain areas for being invasive; California, Hawaii, and New Zealand have strict regulations to protect their native environments and agricultural operations. Gerbils, degus, and domesticated rats have various prohibitions on their ownership.

Characteristics

Guinea pig 

Guinea pigs (cavy) have perhaps been kept the longest as pets among rodents. While historically they served as a foodstuff for the native Inca people, they were imported to Europe as early as the mid-16th century, shortly after Spain conquered Peru. As an oddity from the New World, they were afforded a special status, and seen as house pets, rather than vermin or food. While their popularity was initially limited to the wealthy, their prodigious reproductive habits ensured that they spread throughout the middle classes shortly after their introduction; guinea pig burial places (not scattered bones—as would be found with an eaten animal) have been found in archaeological digs in early modern middle-class suburbs.

Guinea pigs do not store their food. They typically travel in groups, or herds, scavenging for grass and other vegetation. They are commonly active during dawn or dusk when they are less likely to encounter predators (crepuscular). As pack animals in the wild, the domestic Guinea pig also thrives when kept with one or more companions (except boars in the presence of a sow). They live off a diet consisting of grass hay and food pellets, typically synthesized from timothy hay. Like humans, Guinea pigs cannot synthesize their own vitamin C, making their food intake their only source of vitamin C; a lack of vitamin C will often cause fatal scurvy. At merely four weeks old female Guinea pigs become fertile and may produce as many as four to five litters a year. With an average gestation period of 59–72 days, a female Guinea pig may become pregnant again in as few as 6 hours after giving birth. Guinea pigs live to be around 4 to 5 years old.

Fancy mouse 

Fancy mice were popular pets in Japan during the 18th century, due in large part to the abundance of color mutations in wild mice. In 1787, a book on this hobby, The Breeding of Curious Varieties of the Mouse, was published by Chobei Zenya, a Kyoto money exchanger. Over time, the tradition spread from Japan to Europe, and in 1895 the National Mouse Club was established in England.

Fancy mice are nocturnal animals who utilize burrowing and hiding to evade predators due to their general defenselessness. Mice also utilize burrows to avoid light whenever possible. Mice live in families with developed social structure and territorial boundaries between families. Male mice organize themselves into a social hierarchy in which the most dominant mouse becomes the "lead buck", or the one at the top of the social ladder. Only the lead buck mates during mating season; all other mice are restricted by the lead buck or downright rejected by the female mice. Mice possess highly developed senses of smell, hearing, and feeling; however, their sense of sight is poor due to the odd location of their eyes on their head. Mice can hear pitches inaudible to the human ear and communicate with squeaks, some of which reach pitches humans cannot hear, detectable through the use of a microphone and oscilloscope.

Their sense of smell is highly developed and many mice can recognize if another mouse is part of their family groups based on smell alone. Their sense of touch is also highly developed; due to their poor eyesight a lot of movement is interpreted through the utilization of whiskers and guard hairs to orientate themselves and determine their surroundings. Female mice have a gestation period of 19 to 21 days and may have up to 15 litters a year, due to their ability to become pregnant again within 24 hours of giving birth. The average litter size is 10 to 12 pups who are born deaf and blind; within two weeks the litter will resemble small adult mice.

Fancy rat 

Fancy rats first became popular pets in 19th-century England when selectively bred for unusual colouration. They are prohibited in Alberta, Canada, outside of schools, laboratories, and zoos. Fancy rats enjoy the company of their own kind; it is common to keep domestic rats paired together with companions of the same sex; rats housed with the opposite sex will breed rapidly. Whereas mice prefer independence, domestic rats enjoy the company of their owner. Female rats may become pregnant as early as five weeks old; producing a litter of about eight young each time, and are able to become pregnant again within 24 hours. Rats have sharp teeth that never stop growing, and will chew objects such as wood to shave down their teeth to an appropriate length. Wild rats have different diets depending on location. Rats are opportunistic eaters; in the wild, rats are herbivores, as they will scavenge for seeds, plants and fruits. Due to a lack of easily accessible produce in the city, city rats will eat nearly anything, including trash and meat. Domestic rats live slightly longer than wild rats, with life spans of around two years.

Hamster 

Hamsters first gained popularity as pets in the 1930s, with virtually all modern Syrian hamsters (the most common pet species) tracing their lineage back to a single litter of hamsters taken to Palestine for scientific research in 1930. Shortly thereafter, in 1938, hamsters were introduced to the United States. Dwarf hamsters are also popular pets. Wild hamsters are typically found in open areas such as deserts, plains, steppes, and fields. Hamsters scavenge for food, with a diet consisting primarily of grain and insects. Hamsters temporarily store their food in their large cheek pouches for transport to their burrows, where they maintain hoards. Territorial by nature, hamsters will react aggressively towards a member of their own species.

Domestic hamsters that are caged together will act aggressively towards one another as they get older, usually fatally. Syrian hamsters are strictly solitary; while Roborovski dwarf hamsters can rarely be kept in pairs, this is strongly not advised. They typically are nocturnal or crepuscular, though they may be active during both night and day if their sleep schedule is disturbed. Hamsters produce two to four litters a year. Gestation takes 15 to 22 days and newborns only require nursing for approximately three weeks. The domestic hamster population is large; however, despite a rapid reproduction rate, wild hamster populations are diminishing due to habitat destruction and their place near the bottom of the food chain.

Gerbil 

Gerbils became established in the pet industry in 1964. They are prohibited in California. As desert dwellers, gerbils dig long burrows in order to escape the harsh temperatures; however, unlike hamsters, gerbils are not nocturnal. Gerbils are active most during the evening and morning, times in which the weather is calmest, making them primarily crepuscular. Gerbils are naturally curious, social, and nonviolent animals, making them more suitable for children than most pocket pets. Gerbils have an average lifespan of two to four years. Adult male gerbils are very territorial; typically the larger the gerbil, the larger their burrow and the more territory they scent mark. Gerbils communicate through the use of thumping their back legs and whistling sharply; thumping can be both a communication of excitement and anxiety.

Degu 

After initial interest in common degus as research subjects, they have become popular as pets, though until recently they were seldom found in pet shops. Degus are social animals and thrive with a partner when kept as pets. Degus love to run around, exercise, and explore tight locations. Domestic degus require some form of bedding so that they may store their food similarly to wild degus. Degus' incisor and molar teeth never stop growing, so they need access to items to regularly chew on. They are naturally active during the day and rest during night, unlike most other pocket pets. They consume a diet heavy in fiber and require constant access to hay, and small amounts of pellets and leafy vegetables. They are prone to diabetes, so degus need a diet that is low in sugar and fat; fruits and vegetables high in sugar content such as carrots should not be provided. Degus occasionally eat their own droppings to obtain certain nutrients that keep their digestive system healthy. They are prohibited in California.

Chinchilla 

Chinchillas have been used in research since the 1950s. They are popular pets, but require much care. The domestic chinchilla is descended from Chinchilla lanigera, the long-tailed Chinchilla, and so have thinner bodies, longer tails and larger ears. Wild chinchillas roam in herds, so domestic chinchillas also like to have a companion and can live to be over 10 years old. They subsist on a diet of grass, hay, and grass-based chinchilla pellets. Their teeth never stop growing, so they rely on their food to wear down their teeth to the appropriate length. An improper diet can lead to serious dental disease. Chinchillas may eat small amounts of dried fruit and root vegetables as treats, but too much can lead to serious health issues such as obesity. They are typically nocturnal and require a lot of free space to roam around. They average two kits per litter and gestation lasts around 110 days. They can breed at 6–9 months of age. The females are seasonally polyestrous and come into heat every 30 to 90 days during the year. They can have up to three litters in a year if the female breeds soon after giving birth.

See also
Rats as pets
Exotic pet
Ferrets as pets
Rabbits as pets

Notes

References

Further reading
 
 
Species List of Exotic Rodents kept as pets
Christopher Carter Pocket Pets
Pocket Pet Diseases and Resources « CFSPH

Domesticated animals
 
Mammals as pets
Rats as pets
Rodent